Irini Sereti is a Greek scientist and physician. She is chief of the HIV pathogenesis section at the National Institute of Allergy and Infectious Diseases. Sereti researches immune reconstitution inflammatory syndrome, idiopathic CD4 lymphocytopenia, and immune-based therapeutic strategies of HIV investigation.

Education 
Sereti received a M.D. from the University of Athens in 1991. She did research for one year in  laboratory at Rush University Medical Center. Sereti completed an internship, residency, and chief residency in medicine at Northwestern University.

Career and research 
In 1997, Sereti came to the National Institute of Allergy and Infectious Diseases as a clinical associate in the laboratory of immunoregulation. She became a staff clinician in 2003. Sereti was appointed to a clinical tenure-track position in 2009 and received tenure in 2015. She is chief of the HIV pathogenesis section.

Sereti researches the pathogenesis of HIV infection emphasizing mechanisms of immune reconstitution inflammatory syndrome in advanced HIV infection and of serious non-AIDS events in treated HIV-infected patients. She also investigates the pathogenesis of idiopathic CD4 lymphocytopenia (ICL) and immune-based therapeutic strategies of HIV infection and ICL.

References 

Living people
Year of birth missing (living people)
Place of birth missing (living people)
National Institutes of Health people
20th-century women scientists
21st-century women scientists
Women medical researchers
Greek expatriates in the United States
Expatriate academics in the United States
20th-century Greek scientists
21st-century Greek scientists
Greek women scientists
Greek women physicians
20th-century Greek physicians
21st-century Greek physicians
Greek medical researchers
HIV/AIDS researchers
National and Kapodistrian University of Athens alumni